is a Japanese volleyball player who plays for Voreas Hokkaido in V.League Division 2.

In July 2009, Suntory Sunbirds announced that Koshikawa would move to Pallavolo Padova next season.

In July 2012, Suntory Sunbirds announced Koshikawa would join the club in the next season.

Club

Awards

Individuals
 2003-04 Men's V.Premier League – "New Face Award "
 2005 Asian Championship "Best Scorer"
 2005-06 Men's V.Premier League – "Best Server" and "Best 6"
 2006-2007 Men's V.Premier League – "MVP"
 2005 Asian Championship "Best Server"
 2008-09 Men's V.Premier League – "Best Server"
 2009 59th Kurowashiki Tournament – "Best 6"
 2012-13 Men's V.Premier League – "Best Server"
 2013-14 Men's V.Premier League – "Best Server" and "Best 6"
 2014 63rd Kurowashi Tournament – "Best Server" and "Best6"

Team
 2003-04 V.League –  Champion, with Suntory Sunbirds
 2004-05 V.League – 5th place, with Suntory Sunbirds
 2005-06 V.League –  Runner-Up, with Suntory Sunbirds
 2006-07 V.Premier League –  Champion, with Suntory Sunbirds
 2007-08 V.Premier League –  3rd place, with Suntory Sunbirds
 2007 Asian Club Championship – 5th place, with Suntory Sunbirds
 2008-09 V.Premier League – 4th place, with Suntory Sunbirds
 2008 Asian Club Championship –  3rd place, with Suntory Sunbirds
 2009–10 Men's Volleyball Serie A2 – 5th place, with Pallavolo Padova
 2010–11 Men's Volleyball Serie A2 –  Runner-Up, with Pallavolo Padova
 2011–12 Men's Volleyball Serie A1 – 13th place, with Pallavolo Padova
 2012-2013 V.Premier League – 6th place, with Suntory Sunbirds
 2013-2014 V.Premier League –  Runner-Up, with Suntory Sunbirds
 2014 Kurowashiki All Japan Volleyball Championship –  3rd place, with JT Thunders

National team

Senior Team
 2004 World League – 10th place
 2005 World League – 10th place
 2005 World Grand Champions Cup – 4th place
 2005 Asian Championship –  Gold Medal
 2006 World League – 13th place
 2006 World Championships – 8th place
 2006 Asian Games  – 5th place
 2007 World League – 13th place
 2007 World Cup – 9th place
 2007 Asian Championship –  Silver medal
 2008 World League – 6th place
 2008 Summer Olympics – 11th place
 2010 World Championships – 13th place
 2011 World League – 15th place
 2011 Asian Championship – 5th place
 2013 World League – 18th place
 2013 World Grand Champions Cup – 6th place
 2013 Asian Championship – 4th place
 2014 World League – 19th place
 2014 Asian Games –  Silver medal

References

External links
 Horipro-Koshikawa Yu profile
 Koshikawa Yu official blog
 
 Koshikawa Yu interview

1984 births
Japanese men's volleyball players
Living people
People from Western Tokyo
Olympic volleyball players of Japan
Volleyball players at the 2008 Summer Olympics
Japanese expatriates in Italy
Asian Games medalists in volleyball
Volleyball players at the 2002 Asian Games
Volleyball players at the 2006 Asian Games
Volleyball players at the 2014 Asian Games
Medalists at the 2002 Asian Games
Medalists at the 2014 Asian Games
Asian Games silver medalists for Japan
Asian Games bronze medalists for Japan
21st-century Japanese people